The League of Professional System Administrators (LOPSA), founded in 2004, is a professional association for IT Administrators.

History and formation
Originally, the corporation was created as "The System Administrators Guild, Inc" in July 2004 by volunteers of the USENIX Association as part of a plan to spin off its SAGE Special Technical Group into a separate organization. After the spin-off from the USENIX Association was halted in November 2005, the volunteers involved in the spin-off opted to move forward as a new organization which was renamed LOPSA, and began reorganizing itself into an independent entity.

Scope and operations
The organization's mission is "to advance the practice of system administration; to support, recognize, educate, and encourage its practitioners; and to serve the public through education and outreach on system administration issues".

LOPSA has several ongoing programs that it uses to further its mission.

Mentorship
The LOPSA mentorship program was conceived in 2010 as a way to network inexperienced system administrators with senior members of the organization who could help them on project-related topics. As of January 2013, the mentorship program accepts ongoing, rather than project-based, projects. Protege status is open to any system administrator irrespective of membership in LOPSA, while mentor status requires an active membership in the organization.

WiAC Scholarship
There is a well-recognized disparity between men and women in STEM fields. LOPSA provides an annual stipend for one woman to attend the USENIX Women in Advanced Computing (WiAC) Summit. The recipient is chosen through an essay contest.

Regional conferences
LOPSA has formed multiple local chapters in cities in throughout the United States. Two LOPSA chapters have formed regionally-targeted system administration conferences.
 Cascadia IT Conference in Seattle, Washington

Training and tutorials

Organizational structure
The organization is a 501c3 not-for-profit group, and is governed by a nine-member board of directors. The first board was elected in July 2005 by the membership of SAGE. Elections are held each year for either four or five board members, with each election term being for two years.

LOPSA is headquartered in Mount Laurel, New Jersey.

Chapters and affiliations
LOPSA fosters community through local chapters and affiliation with and support for other local groups.

Chapters in the Americas
 Seattle, Washington - Seattle Area Systems Administrators Guild
 Eastern Tennessee - ETENN
 Columbus, Ohio - LOPSA-US-OH-Columbus
 Los Angeles, California - LOPSA-LA
 San Diego, California - LOPSA-SD
 Ottawa - Ottawa Valley System Administrators Guild

Established affiliates
 Los Angeles, California - UNIX Users Association of southern California - LA Chapter

Other regional system administration groups
 Americas
 San Francisco Bay Area - BayLISA
 Australia
 Information Technology Professionals Association (ITPA)

External links
 Official LOPSA website
 LOPSA Governance website
 LOPSA Twitter Feed
 LOPSA on Facebook
 Charity Navigator summary profile

References

System administration
Professional associations based in the United States
Information technology organizations based in North America